Bajgah may refer to:
 Bajgah, Mamasani
 Bajgah, Shiraz